The 1968 Special Olympics World Summer Games were held in Soldier Field, Chicago, Illinois, United States, on July 20, 1968. Some of the smaller indoor events were held in the Conrad Hilton Hotel on Michigan Avenue. The event was co-sponsored by the Chicago Park District and the Joseph P. Kennedy Jr. Foundation.

1,000 athletes from 26 U.S. states, and Canada competed in track and swimming. Swimming had two events including 25 meter races, and track and field had four events including 50 yard dash, 300 yard run, and standing long jump. There was also a softball throwing event.

The athlete's oath was introduced at these games by founder Eunice Shriver at the opening ceremony. The oath is,   "Let me win. But if I can not win, let me be brave in the attempt."

Notable athletes volunteered at the games, including Jesse Owens, Rafer Johnson, George Armstrong, and Stan Mikita.

Planning
The inception of the concept for the Special Olympics came from Anne McGlone (now Anne Burke), at the time a  physical education teacher working for the Chicago Park District. In 1967, while teaching special needs children, she had the idea to host a citywide track meet for such children. She asked Park District Superintendent Erwin "Red" Weiner and Park District Board President William McFetridge for permission to organize it. The Joseph P. Kennedy Jr. Foundation had provided earlier funding to special needs programs in the Park District, thus McFetridge believed that Eunice Kennedy Shriver might be willing to provide funding for such an event. In early 1968, McGlone wrote to Shriver proposing the event, and within days received an enthusiastic response from Shriver. The event evolved from a track meet into an Olympics-style event for special needs children.

To assist in organizing the event, they received help from Dr. William H. Freeberg of Southern Illinois University, who was an expert in recreation for children with disabilities. They also received the assistance of Parks Board vice president Dan Shannon and McFetridge's assistant Ed Kelly. The event began to take a national, then later even an international, scale as planning advanced.

Sports 
 Track and field
 50-yard dash
 300-yard run
 Long jump
 High Jump
 Softball throw
 Swimming
 25-yard swim
 100-yard swim
 Water polo
 Floor hockey

References

External links
 http://www.specialolympics.org/history.aspx

Special Olympics
Special Olympics World Summer Games
Special Olympics World Summer Games
Sports competitions in Chicago
History of Chicago
Special Olympics World Summer Games
Special Olympics World Summer Games
Special Olympics World Summer Games
Special Olympics World Summer Games
Special Olympics World Summer Games
Special Olympics World Summer Games